OPSM (Optical Prescription Spectacle Makers) is a retailer of eye glasses in Australia and New Zealand, with locations in Hong Kong, Singapore, and Malaysia. It is owned by Luxottica, an Italian eyewear conglomerate.

History
OPSM was founded in Sydney in 1932, and was floated on the Australian Securities Exchange in 1962. In May 2001, OPSM sold its Protector Safety Supply Group to Howard Smith. Luxottica acquired a controlling interest in 2003 and in February 2005, OPSM was delisted from the Australian Securities Exchange.

In 2010, OPSM opened the Eye Hub concept store in the Melbourne suburb of Hawthorn, blending optometry and ophthalmology into one practice. As to 2018, it operated 330 stores and 41 franchises.

Laubman & Pank
Laubman & Pank became at one stage the largest eye care business in Australia. It began operations in 1908 with two optometrists deciding to set up their own business. The group was acquired by OPSM in 2001 and is now run by Luxottica, the world's biggest eye care and eye wear conglomerate. Laubman & Pank has 38 stores in Australia.

Hong Kong

OPSM acquired The Optical Centre from Michael Miu in 2002. At that time OPSM also owned another Hong Kong based chain  (known in Chinese under the brand ). Nowadays Luxottica group runs the Hong Kong chain under dual-brand LensCrafters . It also used the brand Sunglass Hut.

References

Luxottica
Eyewear retailers of Australia
Eyewear retailers of New Zealand
Australian companies established in 1932
Retail companies established in 1932
Companies based in Sydney
Companies formerly listed on the Australian Securities Exchange
1932 establishments in Australia